Kim Yu-bin (born October 4, 1988), referred to as Yubin, is a South Korean singer-songwriter, rapper and actress. Kim is a founder and CEO of the entertainment agency RRR Entertainment. She initially rose to fame as a member of South Korean girl group Wonder Girls, formed in 2007 by JYP and active with the group until disbanded in 2017. She made her solo debut in 2018 with the single "Lady", and has continued to release music ever since.

Life and career

1988–2007: Early life, education and struggles
Kim Yu-bin was born in Gwangju, on October 4, 1988. She lived in Korea until high school, attending Anyang High School for a while before moving to San Jose, California, where she studied at and graduated from Leland High School. Yubin graduated from Myongji University with a degree in Film and Musical.

She was originally set to debut as a member of Five Girls under Good Entertainment, along with G.NA, After School's Uee, Secret's Jun Hyo-seong, and Spica's Yang Ji-won. However, the group disbanded shortly before their scheduled debut in 2007 due to Good Entertainment's financial troubles and the members all left for separate South Korean entertainment companies.

2007–2017: Wonder Girls

Yubin made her debut as a new member of the Wonder Girls on September 7, 2007. She was introduced as the main rapper of the group, replacing Hyuna. Although she is known mostly as the rapper of the Wonder Girls, Yubin occasionally acts as an additional vocalist to the group. Examples of which include, "This Time" and "Wishing on a Star". Aside from performing with the group, she has appeared in several music videos including labelmate 2PM's "10 Out of 10" and Shinhwa's "Once in a Life Time". Yubin has also featured in several different artists' singles, i.e. Shinhwa's Andy Lee, Lee Min-woo, Kim Bum-soo, and Chun G. In 2008, she made a short cameo in MBC's popular sitcom, Here He Comes.

Yubin showcased her written lyrics for the first time in Kim Bum-soo's song "Do You Know That?". Since then, Yubin has written her own raps for several other songs. In 2011, she wrote the lyrics for "Girls Girls", "Me, In", and "Sweet Dreams" from the Wonder Girls' second studio album Wonder World. Yubin also wrote the song "Hey Boy" for the group's mini album Wonder Party released on June 3, 2012. In 2013, she made her official acting debut in OCN's drama, The Virus, where she played the role of Lee Joo-yeong, a genius hacker and an IT specialist.

On June 24, 2015, it was announced that the Wonder Girls will be making comeback after two-year hiatus as a band. On August 17, 2015, Yubin was confirmed to join Unpretty Rapstar second season. Her popularity exploded and as a consequence, her makeup and hairstyle became popular in South Korea. On January 26, 2017, it was announced that the Wonder Girls were to disband after their contracts had expired. Yubin was one of two members who chose to remain with JYP Entertainment as solo artists and renewed her contract.
The group released their final single, "Draw Me", on February 10.

2018–present: Solo work and RRR Entertainment
In April 2018, Yubin announced that she is preparing her solo debut through a Cosmopolitan magazine interview. On May 15, JYP Entertainment announced that she has finished filming the music video for the lead single, which is planned to be released alongside her album in early June. Yubin's first single album City Woman was released digitally on June 5, 2018, with the retro lead single "Lady". The B-side track, "City Lover", was not released due to copyrights after previously announcing the track would be delayed, due to similarities with Mariya Takeuchi's 1984 Japanese city pop song "Plastic Love".

On November 27, 2018, Yubin's first EP #TUSM was released digitally alongside the title track "Thank U Soooo Much". The song's lyrics tell off a former partner for providing “too much information” during a breakup, sarcastically thanking them for their unnecessary revelations. Yubin co-wrote all three tracks on the EP and also co-composed the third track "Game Over". "Thank U Sooo Much" charted at number 21 on Billboard'''s World Digital Song Sales chart, marking her first appearance on the chart.

In April 2019, Yubin served as a judge for the JTBC dance competition television show Stage K. On October 30, Yubin released her third single album, Start of the End, alongside lead single "Silent Movie" featuring Yoon Mi-rae. She co-wrote "Silent Movie" and wrote the B-side track "Not Yours". Yubin left JYP Entertainment on January 25, 2020, with her departure announced three days later.

In February 2020, Yubin founded her own music label, RRR Entertainment. Former bandmate Woo Hye-rim is also signed to the label.

In May 2020, Yubin released her single "Yaya (Me Time)", her first released under her own music label named RRR Entertainment (usually stylized in all lowercase). Since, she has also released the special single "Wave", in partnership with CLEF Entertainment on their project "Traveller", in December 2020.

Her follow-up lead single "Perfume" was released in January 2021, with an accompanying single album. The same year, she competed on MBC's King of Mask Singer as "Snow Flower". She also was a cast member of Goal Girls and We're Family.

In 2022, Yubin participated in the television shows The Last Survivor, Dating is Straight, and Queen of Ssireum''.

Discography

Singles

As lead artist

As featured artist

Soundtrack appearances

All credits are adapted from MelOn.

Songwriting and composing credits
All credits are adapted from Korea Music Copyright Association (KMCA) database
And Melon

Filmography

Film

Television series

Television shows

Web shows

Radio show

Music videos

Awards and nominations

Notes

References

1988 births
Living people
Wonder Girls members
English-language singers from South Korea
Japanese-language singers of South Korea
JYP Entertainment artists
Mandarin-language singers of South Korea
Leland High School (San Jose, California) alumni
People from Gwangju
South Korean expatriates in the United States
South Korean female idols
South Korean women rappers
South Korean women pop singers
South Korean television actresses
South Korean television personalities
Unpretty Rapstar contestants
21st-century South Korean women singers
21st-century South Korean singers
21st-century South Korean actresses